Mocquerysia may refer to:
 Mocquerysia (beetle), a genus of beetles in the family Elateridae
 Mocquerysia (plant), a genus of plants in the family Salicaceae